Morten Værnes (born 6 December 1981) is a Norwegian ice sledge hockey player and Paralympian.

As a member of the Norwegian ice sledge hockey team he has one bronze (2010), and one silver (2006) from the Paralympic Games.

References

External links 
 

1981 births
Living people
Paralympic sledge hockey players of Norway
Norwegian sledge hockey players
Ice sledge hockey players at the 2006 Winter Paralympics
Ice sledge hockey players at the 2010 Winter Paralympics
Paralympic silver medalists for Norway
Paralympic bronze medalists for Norway
Medalists at the 2006 Winter Paralympics
Medalists at the 2010 Winter Paralympics
Paralympic medalists in sledge hockey
Ice hockey people from Oslo